Aram Boghossian (born 19 November 1929) is a former international freestyle swimmer from Brazil. He was born in Rio de Janeiro. As of 2004 he was still swimming in the Masters' category.

Graduated in engineering, at the age of 60 he returned to swim in the master category, and works managing the family business.

Son of Armenians, he started swimming at the age of six, in Tijuca, where he also played basketball. At the beginning of his career he did not perform well and was advised to leave the sport; but this encouraged him to train even more. In a decision between the swimming and basketball coaches, he was left with swimming only. 

At the 1948 Summer Olympics in London, he finished 8th in the 4×200-metre freestyle final, and swam the 100-metre freestyle, finishing 14th at semifinals (he swam the first round and qualified for the semifinals but, due to the distance separating the pool from the accommodation, he waited for the race at the competition venue and ate improperly, having indigestion that took him out of the race).  He broke the Brazilian record of the 100-metre freestyle in 1948. His record was broken only in 1956 by Haroldo Lara.

At the inaugural Pan American Games in 1951, in Buenos Aires, Argentina, he won a silver medal in the 4×200-metre freestyle, along with Ricardo Capanema, João Gonçalves Filho, and Tetsuo Okamoto. At the 1952 Summer Olympics in Helsinki, he swam the 100-metre and 4×200-metre freestyle, not reaching the finals.

References

External links 
 

1929 births
Living people
Swimmers from Rio de Janeiro (city)
Brazilian male freestyle swimmers
Swimmers at the 1948 Summer Olympics
Swimmers at the 1951 Pan American Games
Swimmers at the 1952 Summer Olympics
Olympic swimmers of Brazil
Ethnic Armenian sportspeople
Brazilian people of Armenian descent
Pan American Games silver medalists for Brazil
Pan American Games medalists in swimming
Medalists at the 1951 Pan American Games
20th-century Brazilian people